George Ramsden may refer to:
 J. George Ramsden, municipal politician in Toronto, Ontario, Canada
 George Taylor Ramsden, British member of parliament